State Route 265 (SR 265) is a state highway in the U.S. state of California that is part of both Business Loop 5 and Weed Boulevard in the City of Weed in Siskiyou County. SR 265 runs from U.S. Route 97 to Interstate 5.

Route description

The route spurs out of U.S. Route 97 in Weed while carrying Business Loop 5 from that intersection to Interstate 5.  It was once part of U.S. Route 99. For many years the route was hidden, but was signed in 2005 in anticipation of a complete redesign - reconstruction of Weed Boulevard. Previously, the only visual proof of the route was the bridge ID that was spraypainted on the base of the Interstate 5 overpass, i.e. "265 overcrossing".

SR 265 is not part of the National Highway System, a network of highways that are considered essential to the country's economy, defense, and mobility by the Federal Highway Administration.

Major intersections

See also
Business routes of Interstate 5

See also

References

External links

California @ AARoads.com - State Route 265
Caltrans: Route 265 highway conditions
California Highways: SR 265

265
State Route 265
U.S. Route 99
State highways in the United States shorter than one mile